Züri brännt, meaning literally "Zürich is burning" may refer to:

 Züri brännt (film), a Swiss documentary film of 1980
 Opernhauskrawalle, the so-called youth protests of 1980 in the Swiss city of Zürich